The Astronaut Dismantles HAL is an EP by Amplifier. The title references the film 2001: A Space Odyssey, in which astronaut David Bowman disables homicidal computer HAL.

Track listing
 "Continuum" – 8:50
 "Into the Space Age" – 4:58
 "For Marcia" – 4:57
 "The Brain Room" – 0:56
 "Everyday Combat" – 5:32
 "Live Human" – 14:28
(plus hidden track 'Scarecrows')

References

External links
Lyrics Contains lyrics to all Amplifier songs.

Amplifier (band) albums
2005 EPs